The Tea Clipper is a Grade II listed public house at 19 Montpelier Street, Knightsbridge, London, SW7.

It was formerly called The Talbot and was built in the early/mid-19th century.

The pub closed in 2014. In May 2012 the owner, Aldenberg Investments Ltd, had planning permission to turn it into a house refused by the City of Westminster.

References

Grade II listed pubs in the City of Westminster
Knightsbridge
Former pubs in London